Tere Bajre Di Rakhi is a Pakistani Punjabi-language film written and directed by Syed Noor, with music composed by Zulfiqar Ali. It stars Saima Noor making her comeback in Punjabi Industry after 6 years with Nadeem Baig, Mustafa Qureshi, Iftikhar Thakur, Babar Ali along with debutant Abdullah Khan and Jannat Mirza in pivotal roles. The film released on the occasion of Eid-ul-Fitr 2022.

Cast
 Saima Noor as Taari
 Amir Qureshi as Sultan Bakht 
 Mustafa Qureshi as Fateh Muhammad
 Babar Ali as Alam (cameo) 
 Abdullah Khan as Shah Bakht
 Jannat Mirza as Lali
 Shafqat Cheema as Dawar
 Naghma Begum as Taari's Mother
 Agha Majid as Maju Pehlwan
 Saleem Albela
Iftikhar Thakur
Irfan Khoosat as Lachi's Father
Khushboo as Laachi

Production

Filmography of Tere Bajre Di Rakhi began in December 2019. Pakistani TikTok star Jannat Mirza and Abdullah Khan are in the lead roles. Most of the shooting has been done at Syed Noor's Farmhouse in Shergarh DISTRICT.The film is produced by Muhammad Safdar Malik.

References

2022 films
2020s Punjabi-language films
Punjabi-language Pakistani films